The David Hare Block is a part of Kolkata Medical College Hospital.
Most of the general surgical wards are situated in this building. It is named after David Hare, founder of Hare School.

History
The Professor of Surgery at medical college had no separate surgical wards and had a single OT at the MCH building. At the instance of Principal G. Bomford and Surgeon Richard Havelock Charles, the building of a modern surgical hospital was undertaken. In 1910, the Prince of Wales Hospital was opened with 88 beds. The total cost of building the hospital was Rs 10,17,585/- and was so named to commemorate the visit of the Prince of Wales to India. It was formally inaugurated on 22 March 1911 by H.E. Lady Hardinge. In 1976, the Prince of Wales Hospital was renamed the David Hare Block (to pay tribute to the noted philanthropist and only nonmedical Principal of Medical College, on his bicentennial birth celebration.) and a new floor has been constructed. It now houses the surgery and cardiothoracic surgery departments.

Departments
 
Department of General Surgery (most of the wards)
Department of Radiodiagnosis
Department of Radiotherapy
Department of Vascular and Cardiothoracic Surgery
Office of Superintendent of Medical College Kolkata

References

External links 
 Medical College Bengal — A Pioneer Over the Eras

Hospital buildings completed in 1911
Hospitals in Kolkata
Hospitals established in 1910
Medical College and Hospital, Kolkata
1911 establishments in India
20th-century architecture in India